Tess White is an English politician of the Scottish Conservative Party, serving as a  Member of the Scottish Parliament (MSP) for  the North East Scotland Region since May 2021. She was elected in the 2021 Scottish Parliament election. She was the constituency candidate for Dundee City West.

Career 
White worked in the oil and gas industry and served as a board director at Shell Renewables, vice president of Shell International and HR director at Centrica.

Political career 
White unsuccessfully stood as the Conservative candidate for Dundee West at the 2019 United Kingdom general election, where she came in third. She unsuccessfully stood as the Conservative candidate for the Holyrood equivalent in the 2021 Scottish Parliament election, coming third, but she was elected on the regional list in North East Scotland.

During a session of First Ministers' Questions on 2 September 2021, First Minister Nicola Sturgeon was answering a question about anti-Irish and anti-Catholic discrimination in Scotland. As Sturgeon said "...anybody who chooses to live in Scotland [...] this is their home", White interrupted and shouted across the chamber, "unless you're English". She later apologised and withdrew her remark in the parliamentary chamber.

On 12 January 2022, White called for Boris Johnson to resign as Conservative party leader and Prime Minister over the Westminster lockdown parties controversy along with a majority of Scottish Conservative MSPs.

References

External links 
 

Year of birth missing (living people)
Living people
People_from_Hertfordshire
Conservative MSPs
Members of the Scottish Parliament 2021–2026
Female members of the Scottish Parliament
Shell plc people
Centrica people